Roberto Carballés Baena was the defending champion but lost in the final to Tallon Griekspoor.

Griekspoor won the title after defeating Carballés Baena 3–6, 7–5, 6–3 in the final.

Seeds

Draw

Finals

Top half

Bottom half

References

External links
Main draw
Qualifying draw

Murcia Open - 1